Events in the year 1943 in Puerto Rico.

Incumbents
 President: Harry S. Truman
 Governor: Rexford Tugwell
 Resident Commissioner: Bolívar Pagán

Events
uncertain date in 1943 – Legislative Assembly unanimously passes a concurrent resolution calling for an end to the colonial system of government.

January to April

May to August
May 13 – Legislative Assembly passes the "Civil Rights Act of Puerto Rico"

September to December

Deaths
May 13
Trina de Moya – Dominican poet and first lady (1899, 1902–1903, 1924–1930)

See also
1943 in the United States
1943 Atlantic hurricane season
List of earthquakes in 1943
1940s

References

 
1940s in Puerto Rico
Years of the 20th century in Puerto Rico
Puerto Rico
Puerto Rico